Varje Tugim (born 28 July 1978) is an Estonian former footballer who played as a midfielder for the Estonia women's national team.

Career
Tugim was a substitute in the first ever official match for Estonia, against Lithuania. She represented Estonia on 29 occasions.

Personal life
In 2012, she graduated from the University of Tartu.

References

1978 births
Living people
Women's association football midfielders
Estonian women's footballers
Estonia women's international footballers
Sportspeople from Pärnu